Baik Myung-sun (born 12 February 1956) is a Korean former volleyball player who competed in the 1976 Summer Olympics.

References

1956 births
Living people
South Korean women's volleyball players
Olympic volleyball players of South Korea
Volleyball players at the 1976 Summer Olympics
Olympic bronze medalists for South Korea
Olympic medalists in volleyball
Volleyball players at the 1978 Asian Games
Asian Games medalists in volleyball
Sportspeople from Gwangju
Medalists at the 1976 Summer Olympics
Asian Games bronze medalists for South Korea
Medalists at the 1978 Asian Games
20th-century South Korean women